Holcocera sympasta is a moth in the family Blastobasidae. It was described by Edward Meyrick in 1918. It is found in Peru.

References

sympasta
Moths described in 1918